Shine Like a Billion Suns is the ninth and last studio album from Japanese electronica/rock duo Boom Boom Satellites. Two editions of the album were released on February 4, 2015.

Background

In 2014, Boom Boom Satellites created a new song, "Only Blood", for a special trailer for the film Monsterz. Boom Boom Satellites performed at the Tokyo Ex Theater Roppongi with Acidman on July 2, 2014. On July 4, 2014, the band announced that they will be composing the main theme, "Back In Black", for the upcoming anime adaptation of Ninja Slayer. In late November 2014, the band announced that they would be releasing their new album Shine Like a Billion Suns; they will support the album with a concert at the Tokyo EX Theater Roppongi in March 2015. On December 31, 2014, programmer Masayuki Nakano revealed in a blog post on their official website that the guitarist Michiyuki Kawashima's brain tumor issue had once again relapsed at the conclusion of their March 2014 tour, making it the fourth time he had suffered a relapse, and after diagnosis had only been given two more years to live. However, after they had read about boron neutron capture therapy, Kawashima underwent the procedure, all the while writing the new album. Kawashima was recently informed that the spread of the tumors had been successfully stopped, and the band decided to share the information with their fans. Nakano mentioned how proud he was for Kawashima to be able to go through the procedures, continue to tour, and write the album.

Track listing

References

External links
 Boom Boom Satellites official website

2015 albums
Boom Boom Satellites albums